Mouzaki (Greek: Μουζάκι) may refer to several places in Greece:

Mouzaki, a town and a municipality in the Karditsa regional unit
Mouzaki, Elis, a village in the municipal unit of Oleni, Elis

See also

Steve Mouzakis